Rau'shee Warren (born February 13, 1987) is an American professional boxer who held the WBA (Undisputed), and IBO bantamweight titles from 2016 to 2017. As an amateur he won a gold medal at the 2007 World Championships, as well as bronze at the 2005 and 2011 World Championships, all in the flyweight division.

Amateur career

At the 1st AIBA American 2004 Olympic Qualifying Tournament in 2004, at the age of 17, he upset Rayonta Whitfield and Diego Hurtado and international competitors Raúl Castañeda (Mexico), and Miguel Miranda (Venezuela) to qualify as the U.S. boxing team's 106-pound light flyweight representative at the 2004 Athens Olympics. He was both the youngest boxer in the games and the youngest US male in all sports. He was eliminated by the favored  Zou Shiming of China in the first round.

He moved up to flyweight soon after and in 2005 and 2006 became US champion.  At the 2005 World Amateur Boxing Championships in Mianyang he avenged a previous loss to European champion Georgy Balakshin before losing to the Korean surprise winner Lee Ok-Sung and having to settle for bronze.

In 2006 Light middleweight Akima Stocks and Warren were named USA Boxing's 2006 Athletes of the Year. That year he also moved up to fight as a bantamweight, and lost to highly regarded Cuban Guillermo Rigondeaux in November.

In 2007 he returned to the flyweight ranks and repeated as US champion.

At the 2007 World Amateur Boxing Championships in Chicago he defeated European Champion Georgy Balakshin in a rematch and Samir Mammadov to reach the finals. In the finals he defeated Thai Somjit Jongjohor.

In 2008 he became the first American boxer in more than 30 years to compete at two Olympic Games, accomplishing something not done since Davey Lee Armstrong in 1972 and 1976.

At the 2008 Beijing Olympics, Warren lost in the first round, again to Lee Ok-Sung, in a controversial decision given that he assumed that he had won on points.

He remained in the amateur ranks and ascended to the bantamweight division again at the US Nationals 2009 where he controversially lost his semifinal 19:19 (countback loss) to eventual champion Jesus Magdaleno.

While competing for the Los Angeles Matadors in the World Series of Boxing, Warren secured a Bronze in the US nationals in 2009, gold in 2010, and in 2011 a bronze at the Worlds. A gold medal in the 2011 individual competition (they also compete for team titles) at the WSB secured champions in 5 WSB weight classes the first Olympic slots, so participation in WSB saw Warren's first near miss at qualifying (only top 2 ranked boxers after team competition selected for individual title fight). Warren won the 2011 US Olympic Trials and came home with the Bronze after the 2011 AIBA World Championships, securing his place in a 3rd Olympics, unprecedented for an American boxer, at only 25 years old.

On August 3, 2012 at the London Olympics, Rau'shee Warren failed to get past the first round of the brackets yet again for the third time of his amateur career losing to Nordine Oubaali of France in a close decision of 19-18.

World Series of Boxing record

Professional career
Warren made his long-awaited professional debut on November 9, 2012, winning a four-round unanimous decision over Luis Rivera.

Having won thirteen of his first fourteen fights (the only blemish being a three-round no contest against Javier Gallo on December 12, 2014), Warren attempted to win his first world championship—the WBA (Undisputed) and vacant IBO bantamweight titles—on August 2, 2015, but lost a debatable split decision to Juan Carlos Payano.

In a rematch with Payano on June 18, 2016, Warren gained revenge by winning both titles with a majority decision.

However, Warren lost in his first defense to Zhanat Zhakiyanov by split decision.

On 29 July 2017, Warren faced McJoye Arroyo in an IBF super flyweight eliminator. Warren outworked Arroyo in most of the rounds, often being the busier, sharper and tougher fighter. The scorecards read 118-110, 117-109 and 117-109 if favor of Warren.

In his next fight against Juan Gabriel Medina, Warren had another dominant performance and defeated his opponent via unanimous decision, winning every single round on all of the scorecards.

On September 5, 2018, it was announced that Warren would face former Olympics opponent Nordine Oubaali for the WBC bantamweight title, previously vacated by Luis Nery. Both fighters fought well, but it was Oubaali who was the bigger puncher and landed more eye-catching shots. In addition to that, Oubaali was simply busier and sharper than Warren, which ultimately made the difference. The scorecards read 117-111, 116-112 and 115-113 in favor of Oubaali.

On 15 February, Warren faced Gilberto Mendoza. Warren outclassed Mendoza and won the fight comfortably on all three scorecards, 100-90, 99-91 and 99-91.

Professional boxing record

References

External links

Rau'shee Warren profile at Premier Boxing Champions
Washington Post 2004
Rau'shee Warren Amateur Boxing Record
"Rau'Shee Warren", n°56 on Time’s list of "100 Olympic Athletes To Watch"
US championships 2009
Rau'Shee Warren - Profile, News Archive & Current Rankings at Box.Live

1987 births
Living people
Olympic boxers of the United States
Flyweight boxers
Boxers at the 2004 Summer Olympics
Boxers at the 2008 Summer Olympics
Southpaw boxers
African-American boxers
Winners of the United States Championship for amateur boxers
Boxers at the 2012 Summer Olympics
Boxers from Cincinnati
American male boxers
AIBA World Boxing Championships medalists
World Boxing Association champions
International Boxing Organization champions
World bantamweight boxing champions
National Golden Gloves champions